The Schempp-Hirth Quintus is a single-seat 23 metre Open-Class glider built by Schempp-Hirth

Development
The Quintus and the Lange Antares 23E were developed in a joint venture between Lange Aviation GmbH and Schempp-Hirth. The two aircraft share a common wing design and the companies have agreed to coordinate marketing. The 18m inner section of the wing was developed by Lange with the assistance of Professor Loek Boermans of the Delft University of Technology. The outer sections have Maughmer winglets. The wings' moulds have also been used for the Lange Antares H3 experimental fuel-cell aircraft. The biggest differences between Antares 23 E and Quintus are the fuselages and the propulsion units. Lange Aviation have installed an electric system whereas the Quintus has a SOLO 2625-02i combustion engine.

At 58 kg/m2 the Quintus has a wing-loading 20% higher than its predecessors and its high aspect ratio will give good climb rates in thermals. It will only be available as a self-launcher with a steerable tailwheel.

Major competition results
1st place at 2012 World Gliding Championships (Open Class) in Uvalde, Texas

Specifications

See also

References

http://www.schempp-hirth.com/index.php?id=quintus&L=1%22%20onfocus%3D%22blurL
https://web.archive.org/web/20140314102928/http://www.schempp-hirth.com/fileadmin/Pdfs/intern_pdf/2011/Quintus_M-Flyer20_D_web.pdf

2010s German sailplanes
Quintus
Articles containing video clips
Motor gliders
T-tail aircraft
Aircraft first flown in 2011